The Painting of a Christian figure, also known as Fragment of a Christian figure, is a late 9th-century fragmentary silk painting of a haloed man with crosses on his head and chest who has been interpreted as a Christian figure, associated with the Church of the East in China. It was discovered by the Hungarian-born British archaeologist Aurel Stein at the Library Cave (cave 17) of the Mogao Caves in 1908. The painting is in the British Museum, in London.

Description
The figure is represented in a three-quarter view in a manner very similar to some of the paintings of Bodhisattvas, even to the gesture of the right hand. The outer circle of the nimbus has flame-like decoration. He has a fairly thick moustache and a slight beard, both in red. He is wearing a silk stole of red with a yellow lining, over a garment that has faded to a greenish colour very similar to that of the background. The sleeves of the garment end in ruffs and golden bracelets adorn the wrists. A cross, each arm that ends in extensions of beads, appears both in the headdress of the figure and pendant of the necklace that he is wearing, as well as on the top of the long staff that he is holding in the left hand.

Analysis

According to Meicun Lin (a professor of the School of Archeology and Museology at Peking University) and Szonja Buslig (a lecturer of Eötvös Loránd University), they believe that the style of this painting deliberately imitates the reliefs at Taq-i Bustan, a site with a series of large rock reliefs from the era of Sasanian Empire. For example, both have nimbi, wear similar necklaces, and even basic positions are very similar. It is speculated that this painting was made based on the icon of Christ that the Persian missionary Alopen carried to Chang'an, the capital of the Tang Empire.

At first glance, the figure resembles a Bodhisattva, but the western features of the face, together with the red mustache and beard, which are quite different from the green, curling moustaches of Bodhisattvas, begin to hint at a different type of holy figure. That the figure is Christian is evident from the cross on the lotus in the headdress, a symbol can also be seen on the Xi'an Stele, the cross pattern on the necklace, the cross pendant and the staff of a processional cross. The headdress decorated with wings is known from the Kushano-Sasanian art and symbolises sovereignty, the curls at the shoulders remind us of the images of Gandhara Buddha. The narrow flame border of the nimbus is found throughout the Buddhist iconography of Central Asia. The background is scattered with small flowers which may serve to
enhance the sanctity, and therefore the devotion (bhakti).

Icon of Christ
According to the German professor  and Swiss scholar Christoph Baumer, “the figure represents Jesus Christ or a saint”. , a Japanese historian and professor of Kyoto University, argues that “the unearthed in Dunhuang must be an image of Christ”. P. Y. Saeki, the Japanese scholar of religion, also considers the painting to be an icon of Jesus.

Gallery

In popular culture
 The image appears on a missionary leaflet handed to Tan Qi (Rayzha Alimjan) by the Monk Jingde in the 20th episode of The Longest Day in Chang'an.

See also
 Jesus Sutras
 Nestorian cross
 Xi'an Stele
 Ancient Arts of Central Asia
 Nestorian pillar of Luoyang
 Murals from the Christian temple at Qocho
 Manichaean Painting of the Buddha Jesus

Notes

References

External links
 A Christian figure, ink and colours on silk (fragment) at Google Arts & Culture

9th-century paintings
Tang dynasty paintings
Iconography of Jesus
Paintings of saints
Ancient Central Asian art
Church of the East in China
Asian objects in the British Museum